Gafisa (formerly Gomes de Almeida Fernandes Imobiliária Sociedade Anonima) is the fourth largest Brazilian residential construction and real estate company, after Cyrela Brazil Realty, PDG S.A. MRV Engenharia and Brookfield Incorporações. It is based in São Paulo and  present in various cities of Brazil. It was introduced to the market since 1954, and it specializes in projects of high standard, it is also holding a number of other companies. Gafisa's predecessor company is the Cimob Companhia Imobiliária (formerly known as Gafisa Participações S.A.), from whom Gafisa S.A. inherited its brand name, assets, liabilities, and market position.

History
It has more than 950 enterprises, among high-luxury residential condominiums, commercial buildings flats, and shopping centers, that sum to approximately 10 million square meters of built area.

With headquarters in São Paulo and operations in the other cities of the country, Gafisa was founded in 1954 in Rio de Janeiro, under the name ''Gomes de Almeida Fernandes Ltda''. At the end of the 80s, it became the Gafisa property. In 1997, from an association with GP Investments, it became Gafisa SA. In 2006, the Gafisa received a major shareholder: the Equity International Properties (EIP), a North American leader in real estate investment in Latin America, which belongs to Equity Group Investments (LLC), controlled by Samuel Zell.

In 2004, Gafisa created the Board of New Business to care exclusively for new markets beyond the Rio-São Paulo.

The beginning of 2006 was marked by the entry of Gafisa in the New Market of Bovespa corporate governance, from the completion of initial public offering of shares of the company.

In 2007, the Gafisa made public offering of new shares, this time in the New York Stock Exchange (NYSE), which became the first residential real Brazilian listed on NYSE. The event has consolidated its position as a company in line with global standards and global reputation in financial and operational excellence.

Also in the first quarter of 2007, following the diversification of regional and residential products, the company strengthened the commitment to serve the segment of low income through the establishment of Fit Residencial, subsidiary of Gafisa ventures that will develop a low price in urban areas. The first release, the Fit Jacana, occurred in March.

In 2014, Gafisa was recognized as one of the Most Admired companies by Carta Capital magazine in the construction and development segment. The company is also included, for three consecutive years, in Exame magazine's Melhores & Maiores ranking.

The Gafisa also signed a joint venture (JV) with Odebrecht, Brazil's largest engineering and construction, training of District New Ventures Real Estate. The new company will develop residential projects in large scale in the horizontal segment of people outside metropolitan areas.

The Gafisa consolidates its position of leadership in the segment of middle and upper middle class and is now a more geographically diversified construction company of Brazil. The conclusion of the first phase of the acquisition of Alphaville further strengthened this position, expanding its presence in 18 states and 40 cities.

References

Companies listed on the New York Stock Exchange
Companies based in São Paulo
Companies listed on B3 (stock exchange)
Real estate companies of Brazil
Construction and civil engineering companies of Brazil
Construction and civil engineering companies established in 1954
2007 initial public offerings
Brazilian companies established in 1954